Metlifecare is one of New Zealand's largest retirement village providers. They currently own and operate 32 retirement villages throughout the North Island of New Zealand.

They have been listed on the NZX since 1994, and the Australian ASX main board since October 2013. They are a component of the NZX 50 Index.

Competitors of Metlifecare include BUPA, Ryman Healthcare and Summerset Holdings.

History
Metlifecare was founded and first listed on the NZX in 1994 by NZ businessman Cliff Cook. Cook is no longer involved with the company but is now developing other retirement village projects in the UK.

Metlifecare acquired the Private Life Care assets of Retirement Villages New Zealand Limited and Vision Senior Living Limited in May 2012 as part of a three way merger.  This grew Metlifecare to a village portfolio of 25 as at December 2015.

Major investors in Metlifecare now include Infratil, one of New Zealand's largest infrastructure investor, in partnership with the New Zealand Superannuation Fund

In December 2019, Metlifecare received an unsolicited buyout offer from EQT Management, a Swedish funds manager. After a couple of weeks of negotiation, the Metlifecare board has elected to progress the scheme of arrangement that would lead to a completed buyout.

References

Housing for the elderly
Companies listed on the New Zealand Exchange
Service companies of New Zealand